Mayajaal (literally, "phantasmagoria") is an entertainment centre in Kanathur, Chennai, India. It is located on the East Coast Road and spread over an area of 30 acres. It consists of a shopping mall, a multiplex, a sports complex and a resort. Mayajaal has a sixteen screen multiplex and it is the second largest multiplex in Asia.  The sports complex was started in 2003, which also hosted the Indian Cricket League matches. The Resort was opened in 2005 with 40 rooms. The 30,000 sq.ft shopping mall was opened in 2006.

Notable Releases 
Rajinikanth's Kaala got released across all 16 screens.

Ajith's Billa 2 had the highest number of shows of 112 each day for the opening weekend.

Rajinikanth's Sivaji was the first movie to have a continuous theatrical run for 125 days at Mayajaal.

References

External links

Facebook

Twitter

Instagram

Shopping malls in Chennai
Sports venues in Chennai
Buildings and structures in Chennai
Indian Cricket League stadiums
2003 establishments in Tamil Nadu